General Arthur Alexander Dalzell, 9th Earl of Carnwath (15 September 1799 – 28 April 1875) was a Scottish nobleman and soldier. He was the son of Robert Alexander Dalzell, 6th Earl of Carnwath and Andulusia Browne.

Military career
He was lieutenant-colonel of the 48th (Northamptonshire) Regiment of Foot between 1841 and 1853. He became Assistant Secretary for Scotland in 1854 and General Officer Commanding South-Eastern District in April 1861. Promoted to the rank of general in 1873, he also inherited the titles of his nephew, Henry Arthur Hew Dalzell, becoming Earl of Carnwath that same year. Lord Carnwath died unmarried on 28 April 1875 aged 75, in London. His titles were inherited by his younger brother, Harry Burrard Dalzell.

References

|-

Earls of Carnwath
1799 births
1875 deaths
British Army generals
48th Regiment of Foot officers
Burials at Brompton Cemetery